No Country For Old Musicians is the sixth studio album by American rock band Reggie and the Full Effect, released on November 19, 2013. The album was released through the support of a Kickstarter campaign set up by James Dewees himself. The album was the last album produced by longtime collaborator Ed Rose at his studio Black Lodge Recording before his retirement.

The record includes musical cameos from members of My Chemical Romance, Matt Pryor, Allison Weiss, and Adam Lazzara, in addition to other musicians.

Track listing

Personnel
Reggie and The Full Effect
 James Dewees – lead vocals, piano, keyboards, synthesizers 
 Ray Toro – lead guitar, vocals
 Cory White – rhythm guitar, vocals
 Frank Iero – bass, vocals
 Billy Johnson – drums, percussion

Additional musicians
 Matt Pryor – guest vocals on tracks 2, 10 & 14.
 Sean Ingram – guest vocals on tracks 13 & 15.
 Adam Lazzara – guest vocals on track 12.
 Allison Weiss – guest vocals on track 16.

'''Production
Ed Rose – producer

References

External links
 Reggie and the Full Effect website

2013 albums
Alternative rock albums by American artists
Kickstarter-funded albums
Reggie and the Full Effect albums
Crowdfunded albums
Pure Noise Records albums